The 2013–14 DePaul Blue Demons men's basketball team represented DePaul University during the 2013–14 NCAA Division I men's basketball season. The Blue Demons, led by fourth year head coach Oliver Purnell, played their home games at the Allstate Arena, with two home games at McGrath-Phillips Arena, and were members of the newly reorganized Big East Conference. They finished the season 12–21, 3–15 in Big East play to finish in last place. They advanced to the quarterfinals of the Big East tournament where they lost to Creighton.

Roster

Schedule

|-
!colspan=9 style="background:#00438c; color:#F10041;"| Exhibition

|-
!colspan=9 style="background:#00438c; color:#F10041;"| Regular season

|-
!colspan=9 style="background:#00438c; color:#F10041;"| Big East tournament

References

DePaul Blue Demons men's basketball seasons
DePaul